Luka Žvižej (born 9 December 1980) is a retired Slovenian handball player. He competed at the 2004 Summer Olympics in Athens, where the Slovenian team placed 11th. He was listed among the top ten goalscorers at the 2012 European Men's Handball Championship, where Slovenia placed sixth. He was in the national team at the 2013 World Championship and the 2015 World Championship. His last tournament in national team was the 2016 European Championship. He is the all-time best goal scorer for Slovenia with 702 goals.

He is the older brother of Miha Žvižej.

References

External links  
 
 Luka Žvižej profile on eurohandball.com 

1980 births
Living people
Sportspeople from Celje
Slovenian male handball players
Expatriate handball players
Liga ASOBAL players
FC Barcelona Handbol players
Olympic handball players of Slovenia
Handball players at the 2004 Summer Olympics
Slovenian expatriate sportspeople in Spain
Slovenian expatriate sportspeople in Hungary
Slovenian expatriate sportspeople in Germany